The  Tisha massacre was a mass extrajudicial killing that took place in Tisha in the Tigray Region of Ethiopia during the Tigray War, on 1 April 2021. Tisha is a municipality nearby to Wukro Maray in woreda Tahtay Maychew, Central zone of Tigray.

Massacre
The Ethiopian National Defense Force (ENDF)  and Eritrean Defence Forces (EDF) killed c. 100 civilians in Ma’ikhel, the main village of the Tisha municipality (Central Tigray) on 1 April 2021.

Typical massacres committed by Ethiopian and Eritrean soldiers in the Tigray war are (1) revenge when they lose a battle; (2) to terrorise and extract information about whereabouts of TPLF leaders; (3) murder of suspected family members of TDF fighters; and (4) terrorising the Tigray society as a whole such as in case of mass killings in churches.
The massacres in Wukro Maray and surroundings were carried out by Ethiopian and Eritrean forces, while being defeated by TDF.

Perpetrators
EEPA reported the perpetrators of this massacre as being EDF soldiers.

Reactions
After months of denial by the Ethiopian authorities that massacres occurred in Tigray, a joint investigation by OHCHR and the Ethiopian Human Rights Commission was announced in March 2021.

While the Ethiopian government promised that Eritrean troops will be pulled out from Tigray, the Eritrean government denies any participation in warfare in Tigray, let alone in massacres.

See also 
Hambera massacre
Haddush Addi massacre

References

External links
World Peace Foundation: Starving Tigray

April 2021 crimes in Africa
2021 massacres of the Tigray War